Jerico Nelson (born September 19, 1989) is a former American Football strong safety. Nelson signed with the New Orleans Saints as an undrafted free agent in 2012. Nelson played College football at Arkansas.

Early years
Nelson, from New Sarpy, Louisiana, attended both John Curtis Christian School and later Destrehan High School in Destrehan, Louisiana. Nelson was ranked as 23rd athlete in the nation and was ranked as the 9th overall prospect in the state of Louisiana by Rivals.com. He also was ranked as the No. 51 running back in the nation by Scout.com.

College career
He played College football at Arkansas. He finished college with 268 tackles, 10.5 Sacks, 4 Interceptions, 12 Pass Deflections, 2 Forced fumbles.

In his Freshman season, he finished with 37 tackles and 3.5 sacks.

In his Sophomore season, he finished the season with 74 Tackles, 2.5 Sacks, one Interception and a Forced fumble.

In his Junior season, he finished the season with 87 tackles, 2.5 Sacks, one Interception in which it was returned for a touchdown and a forced fumble.

In his Senior season, he finished his Senior season with 70 Tackles, 2 sacks and 4 pass deflections.

Professional career

New Orleans Saints
On April 30, 2012, Nelson signed with the New Orleans Saints as an undrafted free agent. On August 31, 2012, he was released. On September 1, 2012, he was signed to the practice squad. On December 15, 2012, he was promoted to the active roster from the practice squad after the team placed safety Malcolm Jenkins and Offensive tackle Charles Brown on injured reserve.

Texas Revolution
On January 5, 2016, Nelson signed with the Texas Revolution. On January 3, 2017, Nelson re-signed with the Revolution.

References

External links
Arkansas Razorbacks bio
New Orleans Saints bio

1989 births
Living people
People from Kenner, Louisiana
People from New Sarpy, Louisiana
American football safeties
Players of American football from Louisiana
Destrehan High School alumni
Arkansas Razorbacks football players
New Orleans Saints players
Texas Revolution players